Olaf Hampel (sometimes shown as Olav Hampel, born 1 November 1965) is a German bobsledder who competed during the 1990s. Competing in two Winter Olympics, he won gold medals in the four-man event in both 1994 and 1998.

Hampel was also world champion in the two-man event in 1995 and in the four-man in 1996.

Personal life

He has a wife named Kirstine. They live in Nesselwang.

References
 Bobsleigh four-man Olympic medalists for 1924, 1932-56, and since 1964
 Bobsleigh two-man world championship medalists since 1931
 Bobsleigh four-man world championship medalists since 1930

External links
 
 

1965 births
Living people
Sportspeople from Bielefeld
German male bobsledders
Bobsledders at the 1988 Winter Olympics
Bobsledders at the 1994 Winter Olympics
Bobsledders at the 1998 Winter Olympics
Olympic bobsledders of Germany
Olympic bobsledders of West Germany
Olympic gold medalists for Germany
Olympic medalists in bobsleigh
Medalists at the 1998 Winter Olympics
Medalists at the 1994 Winter Olympics